Budtz is a Danish surname and male given name. Notable people with this name include:

 Budtz Müller (1837–1884), Danish photographer
 Hanne Budtz (1915–2004), Danish politician and lawyer
 Hans Egede Budtz (1889–1968), Danish stage and film actor
 Jan Budtz (born 1979), Danish football player
 Ole Budtz (born 1979), Danish football player